Tumblebug may refer to:

 Dung beetle
 Rollover (reversible) plow
 Fresno scraper, earthmoving tool
 A self-balancing motorized unicycle used by maintenance workers in Robert Heinlein's story "The Roads Must Roll"
 Slinky (Australia)
 Tumblebugs (video game)

See also
 Doodlebug (disambiguation)
 Tumble (disambiguation)
 Bug (disambiguation)